The Oktyabr District is a district of the capital city of Bishkek in northern Kyrgyzstan. Its resident population was 238,329 in 2009. It covers the southeastern part of the city, including the residential area Tokoldosh.

Demographics

Ethnic composition
According to the 2009 Census, the ethnic composition (residential population) of the Oktyabr District was:

References 

Districts of Kyrgyzstan
Bishkek